SuperBob is a 2015 British low-budget superhero comedy film about a Peckham postman who develops superpowers after having been hit by a meteorite. The film premiered in London on 16 October 2015, after having first been shown at the London Comedy Film Festival in January 2015 and the San Diego Film Festival in early October 2015.

Plot
In 2008, an asteroid fragment from Jupiter's gravity lands in Peckham, London hitting Robert 'Bob' Kenner, a mild-mannered and socially awkward postman. Gaining Superman-like powers, Bob initially tries to learn how to use his new powers alone, but later hands himself in after an incident where he crashed into the Shard.

He's trained by the Ministry of Defence and Bob (now known as 'SuperBob') becomes the world's first superhero, working for the MOD and the British Government as a 'civil servant'.

6 years later, Bob's boss Theresa Ford authorizes creation of a documentary to show the public that SuperBob is a 'normal guy', as his popularity is mixed with common complaints. These include his simplistic personality and him needing the people he rescues to sign several forms for the MOD. Bob still lives in Peckham with his mandatory security guard Barry and his cleaner Doris - who also works at the care home where Bob's mother lives, trying to raise money to open a nursery in Colombia. Bob explains to the camera crew that he gets a day off from work every Tuesday and reveals that he's going out for his first date in 6 years with librarian June.

While shopping for clothes with Doris for his date, Bob receives an emergency call from Theresa telling him to come in for a meeting; arguing with Doris after she points out he may miss his date with June. The meeting is in preparation for Bob to shake hands with American senator Bill Jackson. He is in London for the MOD Weapons Summit and sees SuperBob as a 'dangerous weapon that Britain doesn't have control over' (although this is mostly part of a smear campaign after America failed to poach Bob from the UK a year previously). However, after talking to June and following Doris' advice, Bob finally stands up to Theresa and leaves to go on the date. He is then called away to the care home after his mother has an accident. A misunderstanding causes Bob's mum (who has short-term memory loss) to think that he and Doris are now dating.

Wanting to keep his mum happy, the pair share a tender dance together at the home's celebration, where it is clear they share romantic feelings. However, June rings and, after confirming that they weren't standing each other up, Bob arranges for them to have dinner together at his house. After he and Doris leave the care home, Bob overhears reports of a multi-car pileup and goes to help. There, he is scolded by Theresa for not following orders and working on his day off. Despite this, he openly disobeys her, comforting to a fatally injured woman before her death. Upon returning home, Doris briefly comforts him until June arrives for dinner. Finding a note from Doris regarding a problem he had earlier, however, Bob decides not to continue with the date as he openly reveals to June that he wants to be with Doris.

The date is brought to a sudden end when Bob and June are brought to the MOD for the Weapons Summit. June reveals that Theresa stopped her from going to lunch with him and that although she does like him, Theresa and the MOD want him to be with June rather than Doris as June is American. However, upon shaking hands with Senator Jackson he learns that the US government has paid for a nursery for Doris and is sending her away. Bob reacts angrily at being manipulated before smashing through the roof of the MOD building and flying off to search for Doris – invoking a worldwide manhunt for him with sightings in several locations around the world.

Bob eventually finds Doris in the care home, with local residents forming a barrier to prevent the police from entering as they express their feelings for each other. He convinces her to go to Colombia with him to follow her dream of working with children. Explaining to the world he's resigning from the MOD and going freelance, Bob declares he is no longer a civil servant or the property of the UK and gives his number for people to call for help. Bidding farewell to Teresa and his mother, Bob and Doris fly off into the night.

In the epilogue, Bob, Doris (and Barry) have relocated to Colombia and now have a relationship, and he continues to work as a superhero. People's views on SuperBob have become more positive; Theresa has been reassigned to Afghanistan and scientists have been examining the meteorite remains in hopes of finding the source of SuperBob's powers, but haven't found anything in their 6 year investigation.

Main cast
 Brett Goldstein as Bob
 Catherine Tate as Theresa
 Natalia Tena as Dorris
 Laura Haddock as June
 Ruth Sheen as Pat
 David Harewood as TV anchor
 Ricky Grover as Barry
 Hattie Hayridge as Pram Woman

Production
Based on an idea by director Jon Drever, the film quickly became a joint project between Drever, writer William Bridges and comedian Brett Goldstein, who stars as SuperBob and also co-wrote the script. Initially intended as a short film, it eventually turned into a feature film once they managed to get Catherine Tate on board. The film was shot entirely in Peckham in 19 days.

Reception
The film received four stars from reviewer Chris Hewitt in Empire, who wrote: "By keeping the lid on effects that would be laughed out of Marvel, and focusing instead on a low-key story of the world’s most powerful man on his day off, Jon Drever and Brett Goldstein’s movie taps into the same reserves of warmth and heart that made Shaun of the Dead soar."

Wendy Ide in The Guardian was less enthusiastic, finding that, "The film shares some thematic similarities with James Gunn’s vigilante nerd picture Super; however, the unfocused, sentimental approach of SuperBob is in stark contrast to the savage edge that made Super such a malicious pleasure."

References

External links
 
  BBFC database
 
 

2015 films
2010s superhero comedy films
2015 action comedy films
British superhero films
British action comedy films
2010s English-language films
2010s British films